Clam chowder is any of several chowder soups in American cuisine containing clams. In addition to clams, common ingredients include diced potatoes, salt pork, and onions. Other vegetables are not typically used. It is believed that clams were used in chowder because of the relative ease of harvesting them. Clam chowder is usually served with saltine crackers or small, hexagonal oyster crackers.

The dish originated in the Northeastern United States, but is now commonly served in restaurants throughout the country. Many regional variations exist, but the three most prevalent are New England or "white" clam chowder, which includes milk or cream, Manhattan or "red" clam chowder, which includes tomatoes, and Rhode Island or "clear" clam chowder, which omits both.

History
Early documentation of "clam chowder" as we know it today did not contain milk and was thickened during cooking using crackers or stale bread. The first recipe for Manhattan clam chowder, with tomatoes and no milk, was published before 1919, and the current name is attested in 1934.

Primary variants and styles

As recipes for clam chowder spread throughout the United States in the 19th and 20th centuries, many regionally developed variants have arisen.

Manhattan clam chowder

Manhattan clam chowder has a red, tomato-based broth and unlike New England clam chowder there is no milk or cream. Manhattan-style chowder also usually contains other vegetables, such as celery and carrots to create a mirepoix. Thyme is often used as a seasoning.

Many sources attribute its creation to Rhode Island's Portuguese fishing communities who were known both for their traditional tomato-based stews and for their frequent travels to New York City's Fulton Fish Market during the mid-1800s. While Rhode Island clam chowder is clear, it was relatively common in Rhode Island for some cooks to add tomato sauce to their chowder. In Rhode Island this style chowder is also frequently referred to as "Rocky Point Clam Chowder" as it was a popular menu item at the Rocky Point Amusement Park Shore Dinner Hall since the park opened in 1847.

This chowder was at times called by various names including "Clam Chowder - Coney Island Style" (1893). Manhattan clam chowder is included in Victor Hirtzler's Hotel St. Francis Cookbook (1919) and "The Delmonico Cook Book" (1890) as "clam chowder". The "Manhattan" name is first attested in a 1934 cookbook.

New England clam chowder
New England clam chowder, occasionally referred to as Boston or Boston-style clam chowder, is a milk or cream-based chowder, and is often of a thicker consistency than other regional styles. It is commonly made with milk, butter, potatoes, salt pork, onion, and clams. Flour or, historically, crushed hard tack may be added as a thickener.

New England clam chowder is usually accompanied by oyster crackers. Crackers may be crushed and mixed into the soup for thickener, or used as a garnish.

Rhode Island clam chowder
Rhode Island clam chowder is made with clear broth, and contains no dairy or tomatoes. It is common in southeastern Rhode Island through eastern Connecticut. In Rhode Island, it is sometimes called "South County Style" referring to Washington County, where it apparently originated.

Long Island clam chowder
Long Island clam chowder is part New England-style and part Manhattan-style, making it a pinkish creamy tomato clam chowder. The name is intended as humorous: Long Island is between Manhattan and New England. The two parent chowders are typically cooked separately before being poured in the same bowl. This variant is popular in many small restaurants across Suffolk County, New York.

See also

 Bisque
 Corn chowder
Cream of mushroom soup
 Fish stew
 List of clam dishes
 List of cream soups
 List of fish and seafood soups
 List of regional dishes of the United States
 Oyster stew

References

External links

 The New England Chowder Compendium

Cream soups
Chowder
Fish and seafood soups
Cuisine of New York City
New England cuisine
American seafood dishes
American soups